Nolan Richard Sanburn (born July 21, 1991) is an American professional baseball pitcher.

Sanburn attended Kokomo High School in Kokomo, Indiana. He then enrolled at the University of Arkansas, where he played college baseball for the Arkansas Razorbacks. He pitched mostly in relief. Sanburn's younger brother, Parker, also enrolled at Arkansas to play baseball for the Razorbacks.

The Oakland Athletics selected Sanburn in the second round of the 2012 MLB Draft. He signed with the Athletics, receiving a $710,000 signing bonus, beginning his professional career. Though the Athletics had hoped to develop Sanburn as a starting pitcher, a lack of durability led the organization to keep him in relief. For the Stockton Ports of the Class A-Advanced California League in 2014, Sanburn pitched to a 3.28 earned run average with 73 strikeouts to 25 walks. The Athletics traded Sanburn to the Chicago White Sox for Adam Dunn on August 31, 2014.

Sanburn was released by the White Sox on March 29, 2017. He was signed by the Nationals to a minor league contract on April 24, 2017. He was released after the 2017 season.

References

External links

1991 births
Living people
Arkansas Razorbacks baseball players
Vermont Lake Monsters players
Beloit Snappers players
Stockton Ports players
Birmingham Barons players
Winston-Salem Dash players
Glendale Desert Dogs players
Potomac Nationals players